Pantherophis alleghaniensis, commonly called the eastern rat snake, is a species of nonvenomous snake in the family Colubridae. The species is endemic to North America.

Common names
Additional common names for P. alleghaniensis  include black rat snake, pilot snake, pilot black snake, chicken snake; and in Florida, yellow rat snake and Everglades rat snake.

Geographic range

P. alleghaniensis is found in the United States east of the Apalachicola River in Florida, east of the Chattahoochee River in Georgia, east of the Appalachian Mountains, north to southeastern New York and western Vermont, eastern Pennsylvania, Maryland, South Carolina, North Carolina, Georgia, south to the Florida Keys. In the Florida Panhandle, it readily hybridizes with the gray rat snake (Pantherophis spiloides).

Description

Adult eastern rat snakes commonly measure  in total length (including tail), with a few exceeding .

Adults are shiny black dorsally, with a cream or white chin and throat.  The belly has an irregular black and white checkerboard pattern, becoming uniformly slate gray towards the tail. Juveniles have dark dorsal blotches on a grayish ground color. The ventral pattern in juveniles is the same as in adults. The eyes are round with a black pupil, and particularly in juveniles but not always present in adults, a distinct white margin.

The dorsal scales are weakly keeled, and are arranged in 23 to 27 rows at midbody.

Males and females have the same coloration. Males have proportionally longer tails (16-19% of total body length) compared to females (14–18% of total body length).

Habitat
The eastern rat snake occurs in a variety of habitats. These include farmlands, hardwood forests, forested wetlands, thickets and fields adjacent to forests, isolated urban woodlots and backyards that support populations of prey species. The eastern rat snake does especially well in early successional and edge habitats. An arboreal species, it can get into human residences, where it may live in attics undetected. At the northern limits of its range, distribution appears to be restricted by the availability of suitable hibernating sites. In these climates, it requires southern exposures to receive maximal thermal benefit from the winter sun and to provide basking areas in early spring and late fall.
The three U.S populations located more northerly (Illinois at 378N, Kansas at 388, Maryland at 398) hibernate, with very rare appearances before April and after October. In most northern locations latitudinal and longitudinal effects are likely because of thermal restriction or modification of activity associated with winter temperatures at higher temperatures. There are consequences of thermal constraints regarding ecological parameters such as causes of variation of seasonal mortality, population demography, limits to geographic distribution, and the expression or evolution of traits such as habitat selection, reproductive allocation, and mechanisms of physiological hibernation remain complex and incompletely understood.

Behavior and ecology
The eastern rat snake is primarily active at night during the summer, and diurnal in the spring and fall. It is a terrestrial burrower and an excellent climber, and it may enter water. It is found under rocks and boards, and in trees under bark and within knot holes and palm fronds. The snake is a constrictor, and adults eat mainly endotherms while young eat mainly ectotherms. The diet includes rodents, lizards, frogs, and birds and their eggs. The snakes can also eat young chickens and chicks, hence the common name chicken snake.

Rat snakes are most vulnerable to predators as juveniles.  Predators of P. alleghaniensis include hawks (Buteo spp.), great horned owls (Bubo virginianus), foxes, raccoons, and domestic cats. Adult eastern rat snakes have few known predators other than humans. When frightened, a rat snake will freeze. If harassed, it will produce a foul-smelling musk to deter predators.  If provoked further, it may coil, shake its tail, and snap at its attacker.

Eastern rat snakes hibernate during the winter underground or in deep crevices. They may congregate in the same dens with other species of snakes, such as copperheads (Agkistrodon contortrix), eastern racers (Coluber constrictor) and timber rattlesnakes (Crotalus horridus). In Northern climes, the snakes are active from late April to October and mate in May or June. It is active earlier in the South.

Reproduction
Eastern rat snakes reach sexual maturity in their fourth year. The snakes start to breed in May and June, earlier in the South. Males approach females to initiate breeding and may combat other males before breeding. About five weeks after mating, the female lays 5 to 27 eggs in hollow standing and fallen trees, compost and mulch heaps, sawdust piles, and decomposing logs.  Incubation is about two months, and eggs hatch from July through September. Hatchlings are usually just over a foot long at birth, with the distinct gray and black pattern characteristic of juveniles.

Taxonomy
P. alleghaniensis has sometimes been considered a subspecies of P. obsoletus, to which it is closely related.

This species has often been placed in the genus Elaphe, but recent phylogenetic analyses have resulted in its transfer to Pantherophis.

References

Further reading
Holbrook JE (1836). North American Herpetology; or, A Description of the Reptiles Inhabiting the United States. Vol. I. Philadelphia: J. Dobson. 120 pp. (Coluber alleghaniensis, new species, pp. 111–112 + Plate XX).
Jan G, Sordelli F (1867). Iconographie générale des Ophidiens: Vingt-quatrième livraison. Paris: Baillière. Index + Plates I-VI. (Elaphis alleghaniensis, Plate II, Figure 1 [adult], Figure 2 [juvenile]). (in French).

External links

 

Colubrids
Reptiles of the United States
Reptiles of Canada
Reptiles of Ontario
Taxa named by John Edwards Holbrook
Reptiles described in 1836